Dochra Airfield  is an Australian Army airbase located at Singleton, New South Wales, Australia.

See also
List of airports in New South Wales

References

Australian Army bases
Airports in New South Wales